Monochroa cleodoroides is a moth of the family Gelechiidae. It was described by Sakamaki in 1994. It is found in Japan (Honshu,
Kyushu) and Korea.

References

Moths described in 1994
Monochroa